Taipei Century Plaza, is a skyscraper office building located in Xinyi District, Taipei, Taiwan. The building was completed in 1997 and is located next to Hsin Ji Building, which was also completed in the same year. The ground floor of the building houses the Shimao branch of Hua Nan Bank.

See also 
 List of tallest buildings in Taiwan
 List of tallest buildings in Taipei
 Hsin Ji Building
 Asia Plaza Building
 Xinyi Anhe MRT Station Entrance Building

References

1997 establishments in Taiwan
Skyscraper office buildings in Taipei
Office buildings completed in 1997